A vocabularyclept poem is a poem which is formed by taking the words of an existing poem and rearranging them into a new work of literature.

Vocabularyclept poetry was first proposed in 1969 by Word Ways editor Howard Bergerson. He took his little-known 1944 poem "Winter Retrospect", put all the words in alphabetical order, and challenged readers to arrange them all into a new poem.  The challenge was taken up later that year by J. A. Lindon, who, without having consulted Bergerson's original, produced an entirely different poem also titled "Winter Retrospect".  Both poems are 24 lines long and contain 478 words, and have been subject to several literary and statistical analyses.

Many vocabularyclept poems by Lindon and others appeared in later issues of Word Ways.  These and others are collected and discussed in various wordplay books by Bergerson and David Morice.

A variation on the idea of rearranging an existing vocabulary into a poem was independently discovered by Dave Kapell.  His Magnetic Poetry kits consist of individual words—often related to a particular theme or topic—printed on small magnets which can be creatively arranged on a refrigerator or other metal surface.

See also
Anagrammatic poetry
Cut-up technique
Magnetic Poetry

References

Word play
Genres of poetry